The Jiji Line is a branch line of the Taiwan Railways Administration, located in Changhua and Nantou Counties in Taiwan. The length of the line is 29.7 km.

History 
The line was originally built by Taipower in 1922 to facilitate the construction of Mingtan Pumped Storage Hydro Power Plant in Sun Moon Lake. Afterwards, the colony government purchased the route in 1927.

The line was severely damaged in the 1999 Chi-Chi earthquake on 21 September 1999, but was repaired and resumed operations in February 2002.

In March 2010 service on the line was suspended in order for work to be performed on seven railway tunnels between Zhuoshui Station and Checheng Station. The maintenance repaired damage that the tunnels had sustained during the 1999 earthquake and expanded the tunnels' width. The line reopened on July 9, 2011.

Operation 

On Jiji Line, there are twelve runs daily in each direction, with seven eastbound runs starting at Ershui Station and ending at Checheng Station, while two eastbound runs begin at Tianzhong Station, with one eastbound run daily between Yuanlin Station and Checheng Station. There is also one round trip per day between Changhua Station and Checheng Station, however, these depart very early in the morning and very late at night. Westbound there are eight Checheng-Ershui runs, three Checheng-Tianzhong runs, and one run between Shuili Station and Changhua Station. The headway between each run is about two hours. Due to the line being single tracked, only two trains can travel the full length at a time, with the two meeting at Zhuoshui Station. Historically, only the TRA's DRC1000 trains could operate on the line due to the width of the line's tunnels. Following the renovations from 2010 to 2011, the Jiji Line became navigable to other types of trains.

Stations and fares

Stations

Fares 
A one-way ticket fare, from Ershui to Checheng, is NT$44 by mileage for adults. And, an unlimited-rides pass fare is NT$80, for used in one day. The Jiji Line ticket and one-day round-trip pass is available for purchase at all the following TRA stations: Zhunan, Miaoli, Fengyuan, Taichung, Changhua, Yuanlin, Tianzhong, Ershui, Dajia, Shalu, Douliu, Dounan, and Chiayi.

Using the MRT calculation, the fare will be NT$55 in the future, and will support Easycard.

See also 
 1999 Jiji earthquake aka 921 earthquake

References 

1922 establishments in Taiwan
Buildings and structures completed in 1922
TRA routes
3 ft 6 in gauge railways in Taiwan